The Protection Force of Êzîdxan (HPÊ), is a Yazidi military force founded by Haydar Shesho in the summer of 2014 in response to the Sinjar massacre. It was bigger than the other main Yazidi militia who took part in the liberation of Sinjar from Islamic State, the Sinjar Resistance Units, which is aligned with the PKK-backed Kurdistan Communities Union.

The militia was known as the Protection Force of Sinjar or HPŞ, also translated as Sinjar Defense Units or Sinjar Protection Force, until November 2015, when it changed its name to Hêza Parastina Êzîdxanê or HPÊ.

Haydar Shesho was arrested on 5 April 2015 by the Kurdistan Democratic Party's Kurdistan Regional Government forces for "creating an illegitimate new militia." He was released a week later after it was negotiated that he would register with the KRG's Ministry of Peshmerga. He has been quoted as saying “We fight only for Yazidis, not for any party."

In October 2015, the HPŞ participated in the foundation of the Sinjar Alliance as an all-Yazidi joint commando umbrella structure with the Sinjar Resistance Units, the Êzîdxan Women's Units, and other, independent Yazidi units recruited to the united Yazidi front.

Under the joint command of the newly founded Sinjar Alliance, the Êzîdxan Protection Force took part in the successful November 2015 Sinjar offensive.

The HPÊ joined the Peshmerga of the Kurdistan Regional Government in 2017. This, despite the warnings of Haydar Shesho in the immediate aftermath of the liberation of Sinjar over a "war of flags". Massoud Barzani, leader of the KDP and the most powerful figure in Iraqi Kurdistan, claimed on television that only KRG Peshmerga were involved in the Sinjar offensives. ezidiPress quoted from the office of Haydar Shesho: "the next battle... might be the most difficult: the abolition of the one-party dictatorship."

See also
 Yazidi genocide
 List of armed groups in the Iraqi Civil War
 November 2015 Sinjar offensive

Notes

References

Paramilitary forces of Iraq
Anti-ISIL factions in Iraq
Sinjar Alliance
Religious paramilitary organizations
2014 establishments in Iraq
Military units and formations established in 2014
Yazidi organizations in Iraq